Djuma Shabani (born 16 March 1993) is a Congolese professional footballer who plays as a right back for Yanga SC and the DR Congo national team.

Club career
Shabani was born in 1993 in Kindu, and played football for the Kinshasa-based club Bel'Or before joining FC Renaissance. In July 2015, he was one of five Renaissance players banned for two years by the Congolese Federation for abusing match officials. Three months later, the five were among the beneficiaries of a general amnesty for those sanctioned under its jurisdiction for non-financial offences. He captained the team in 2016–17 and was described as the "kingpin of the defence", but left at the end of that season for Vita Club. He helped his new club win the 2017–18 Linafoot title as well as reach the 2018 CAF Confederation Cup Final, in which they lost 4–3 on aggregate to Raja Casablanca.

International career
Shabani was called into the DR Congo senior squad for the first time in May 2018, as a late replacement for a friendly against Nigeria, but did not take the field. He made his senior international debut in March 2019, as a second-half substitute as DR Congo held on to the one-goal lead that confirmed their qualification for that year's Africa Cup of Nations. Shabani was named in the provisional 26-man squad for the competition.

References

1993 births
Living people
Democratic Republic of the Congo footballers
Democratic Republic of the Congo international footballers
Association football defenders
FC Renaissance du Congo players
AS Vita Club players
Linafoot players
2019 Africa Cup of Nations players
21st-century Democratic Republic of the Congo people
Democratic Republic of the Congo A' international footballers
2020 African Nations Championship players
Democratic Republic of the Congo expatriate footballers
Democratic Republic of the Congo expatriate sportspeople in Tanzania
Expatriate footballers in Tanzania